Clubul Sportiv Comunal Dumbrăvița, commonly known as CSC Dumbrăvița, FC Dumbrăvița, or simply as Dumbrăvița, is a Romanian football club based in Dumbrăvița, Timiș County, which competes in the Liga II.

Founded in 2009, CSC Dumbrăvița played at the amateur level until 2018, when it promoted to the Liga III. The geographic positioning of Dumbrăvița, located near the city of Timișoara, resulted in a 168% population growth between the 2002 and 2011, and subsequently led to a significant increase in the economic strength of the commune in the recent years. In the summer of 2022, the club achieved promotion for the first time to the Liga II.

The team plays its home matches at the Stadionul Ștefan Dobay, which is named after the most notable footballer born in Dumbrăvița.

History
CSC Dumbrăvița was founded in 2009, somewhat as a result of the commune's economic development over the last 20 years. Enrolled in the Liga IV, Timiș County series, on the place of Top Alumino Timișoara, "the white and greens" were ranked in the middle of the table for most of their seasons, the best performance until promotion being a 4th place at the end of the 2015–16 edition. Dumbrăvița won Liga IV, Timiș Series at the end of the 2017–18 season, as well as the promotion play-off against Mehedinți County champions, Viitorul Șimian.

In their first season of Liga III, Dumbrăvițenii were ranked 3rd in the 4th series, after champions CSM Reșița and runners-up Șoimii Lipova, until now, this being the best performance in the history of the club near Timișoara.

Grounds
CSC Dumbrăvița plays its home matches on Ștefan Dobay Stadium in Dumbrăvița, with a capacity of 1,000 seats. The stadium is named in honor of Ștefan Dobay, biggest sporting personality born in the commune.

Honours
Liga III
Winners (1): 2021–22
Liga IV – Timiș County
Winners (1): 2017–18

Players

First team squad

 (on loan from CFR Cluj

Out on loan

Club Officials

Board of directors

Current technical staff

League history

References

External links
 
 CSC Dumbrăvița at frf-ajf.ro

Football clubs in Timiș County
Association football clubs established in 2009
Liga II clubs
Liga III clubs
Liga IV clubs
2009 establishments in Romania